Tony Eccles (born 8 January 1970) is an English former professional darts player and convicted rapist. Nicknamed The Viper, he played in both the British Darts Organisation (BDO) and the Professional Darts Corporation (PDC). He reached the quarter-finals of the BDO World Darts Championship twice and is a former winner of the Dutch Open, British Open and British Pentathlon.

Career

BDO career
He made his debut in the World Championship in 2002 but only won one match in his first five visits to Lakeside. Having lost to Wayne Jones (2002), Erik Clarys (2003) and John Walton (2004) he notched his first ever win at the World Championship against Tony David in 2005, before falling to Vincent van der Voort in the second round.

A first round loss again followed to Per Laursen in 2006, but his best run at the event came in 2007 when he progressed to the quarter finals before losing 4–5 to Mervyn King. Tony led King 3–0 but found himself 4–3 down before taking the match into the deciding set, which he lost.

He has had some success in some British Darts Organisation Open events away from the television cameras.

In 2005, he won the Dutch Open, England Open and Sweden Open and in 2006 took the Norway Open and successfully defended his Sweden Open title. He has maintained a high world ranking as a result of these performances, which helped him to be seeded five for the World Championship in 2006 and four in 2007.

In April 2007, he won the Norway Open for the second successive year.

PDC career
On the eve of the UK Open in June 2007, Eccles announced that he would be switching to compete on the PDC circuit. At the time of his switch he was ranked number 2 in the WDF and number 4 in the BDO world rankings and began his PDC career placed 151st in their Order of Merit. He made his debut to the World Championship in 2008, losing to Adrian Lewis 4–3 in the third round having led 2–0 and missing darts to lead 3–0. In the 2009 PDC World Darts Championship, Eccles, the number 30 seed, faced Dutchman Remco van Eijden. Eccles took a 2–0 lead before van Eijden, who played in the BDO World Darts Championship twelve months previously, came back to level at two sets all before Eccles eventually took the match with a 3–2 win to progress to the second round. He was then beaten by third seed James Wade.

Eccles was seeded 31 for the 2010 PDC World Championship but lost 3–1 in the first round to Brendan Dolan.

BDO return
After an injury and average performances on the floor, Eccles returned to the BDO circuit in 2012.

Eccles qualified for the 2013 BDO World Championship, winning the first five legs of his first round match against Geert De Vos and missing three darts to win the second set before eventually losing 3–2. The following year, Eccles was drawn against fifth seed Darryl Fitton in the first round and won 3–1. He subsequently beat Wesley Harms 4–3 after surviving a match dart in the sixth set and hitting back-to-back finishes of 80 and 122 to stay in the match before going on to win. Eccles was defeated 5–2 against Robbie Green in the quarter-finals. He announced his retirement from playing professional darts after the 2014 BDO World Darts Championship.

Child abuse trial 
On 24 June 2014, Eccles was convicted at Teesside Crown Court of five counts of rape and five counts of indecent assault on a schoolgirl. On 26 June, he was sentenced to 16 years in prison. He was released from prison on license, on 1 July 2022, after eight years.

World Championship performances

BDO
 2002: 1st round (lost to Wayne Jones 2–3)
 2003: 1st round (lost to Eric Clarys 1–3)
 2004: 1st round (lost to John Walton 2–3)
 2005: 2nd round (lost to Vincent van der Voort 1–3)
 2006: 1st round (lost to Per Laursen 2–3)
 2007: Quarter-final (lost to Mervyn King 4–5)
 2013: 1st round (lost to Geert De Vos 2–3)
 2014: Quarter-final (lost to Robbie Green 2–5)

PDC
 2008: 3rd round (lost to Adrian Lewis 3–4)
 2009: 2nd round (lost to James Wade 2–4)
 2010: 1st round (lost to Brendan Dolan 1–3)
 2011: 1st round (lost to Adrian Lewis 0–3)

Performance timeline

BDO

PDC

References

External links
Official website
Lakeside 2006 brochure profile
Profile and stats on Darts Database

1970 births
British Darts Organisation players
English people convicted of indecent assault
English darts players
English people convicted of rape
Living people
Sportspeople from Hartlepool
Professional Darts Corporation former tour card holders
Prisoners and detainees of England and Wales